Ardara is an unincorporated community in Westmoreland County, Pennsylvania, United States. Ardara has a post office, with ZIP code 15615, which opened on May 6, 1907.

References

Unincorporated communities in Westmoreland County, Pennsylvania
Unincorporated communities in Pennsylvania